Claudia Prats Sánchez (born 28 January 2000) is a Cuban footballer who plays as a midfielder for the Cuba women's national team.

International career
Prats capped for Cuba at senior level during the 2020 CONCACAF Women's Olympic Qualifying Championship qualification.

References

2000 births
Living people
Cuban women's footballers
Cuba women's international footballers
Women's association football midfielders
21st-century Cuban women